Geza Šifliš (25 February 1907 – 18 November 1948) was a Yugoslav football goalkeeper of Hungarian ethnicity. He was part of Yugoslavia's team at the 1928 Summer Olympics.

Nicknamed Gouliver for his height and strength, he played in top league clubs in Yugoslavia and Hungary.

Career
Born in Ókeresztúr, Austria-Hungary (nowadays Srpski Krstur, Serbia), he first appeared playing for SAND Subotica in the 1927 Yugoslav Football Championship.  Then in 1929 he moved to Hungary where he first played with Ferencváros between 1929 and 1931, and then with Újpest between 1931 and 1933.

He played five matches for the Yugoslavia national team, one of them at the 1928 Summer Olympics against Portugal.  He played all 5 national team matches while playing with SAND.

He was an ethnic Hungarian, and after joining Hungarian side Ferencváros, he stayed in Hungary. In 1936, he married Hungarian swimmer Magda Szász. He died in Baja, Hungary on 18 November 1948.

References

1907 births
1948 deaths
Hungarians in Vojvodina
Serbian footballers
Yugoslav footballers
Yugoslavia international footballers
Footballers at the 1928 Summer Olympics
Olympic footballers of Yugoslavia
Association football goalkeepers
SAND Subotica players
Yugoslav First League players
Ferencvárosi TC footballers
Újpest FC players
Expatriate footballers in Hungary